Nathan C. Price was an American engineer and inventor. He made substantial contributions to several US aircraft projects during the first half of the twentieth century.

Pressurized cabin 
Before World War II, American airplane manufacturer Boeing had responded to a government solicitation for a large strategic bomber. Its proposal, the B-17 Flying Fortress, was considered "too big" by some members of Congress when additional financing was requested for the project. Fearing the project would be canceled and hoping to salvage something from the design effort, Boeing President Claire Egtvedt, who was aware that fledgling airline companies Trans World Airlines and Pan American World Airways were seeking the ability to operate their airliners above most of the frequent low-level turbulence on their routes, proposed that those airlines underwrite the cost of creating a pressurized airliner from components of the B-17. The Model 307 airliner would utilize the B-17's wings and tail.

The airliner's four Curtiss Wright R-1820 radial engines used crankshaft-driven two-speed superchargers both for added power and for greater performance at altitude. To provide pressurized air for the proposed cabin, the two inboard engines also drove (via a shaft) an additional supercharger mounted on each engine's firewall.

Dr. W. Randy Lovelace of the Mayo Clinic, was consulted; he advised that cabin pressurization begin at 8,000 feet MSL. Then pressurized air would be added as required to maintain an 8,000-foot cabin pressure. Above 16,000 feet MSL, cabin pressure would again decrease, due to the limited rating of the superchargers. The plane was expected to have a maximum cruise altitude of 20,000 to 22,000 feet MSL.

Price's cabin pressure regulator was the heart of the pressurization system. Its inlet valve regulated the flow of ventilating air to the cabin; its discharge valve opened as directed to maintain the required pressure. The valves' operations were controlled by a "black box", a maze of valves, venturis, and pleated metal bellows. Incoming air was drawn through slits on the wing leading edge; discharged air exited below the empennage.

Price received a United States patent for his work. After the prototype was working correctly, a contract was given to Garrett AiResearch in California to manufacture the components.

P-38 supercharger 
In 1937 the Lockheed Company responded to a government proposal for an advanced fighter with a two-engine design of unusual configuration. Designers opted to incorporate the Allison V-1710 engine, which used a single-stage supercharger. This severely limited its performance at higher altitudes, so Lockheed added exhaust-driven superchargers, which solved the altitude problem. The GE-supplied turbochargers were upgraded in 1941 for higher-altitude missions, so Lockheed contracted with Price to analyze the installation and provide improvements. He is credited with the system's success after that time.

Axial-flow jet engine 

In 1930, Nathan Price joined Doble Steam Motors, a manufacturer of steam engines for cars and other uses. In 1933 he began working on a steam turbine for aircraft use. The engine featured a centrifugal compressor that fed air to a combustion chamber, which in turn fed steam into a turbine before exiting through a nozzle, powering the compressor and a propeller. The engine was fitted to a test aircraft in early 1934, where it demonstrated performance on par with existing piston engines, except for difficulty maintaining power at higher altitudes due to the compressor. Work on the design ended in 1936 after Doble found little interest in the design from aircraft manufacturers or the Army.

Price started work on his own turbojet design in 1938. To improve fuel efficiency, he used a combination of low-compression axial compressor stages feeding a high-compression reciprocating compressor. In 1941 he was hired by Lockheed to evaluate the General Electric superchargers being fit to the experimental XP-49, a high-altitude version of the P-38. Price had the basic design of his jet completed and was able to attract the interest of Chief Research Engineer Kelly Johnson. Johnson had been thinking about a new high-speed design after running into various compressibility problems with the P-38 and the jet engine appeared to solve some of the problems. During 1941 he ordered the development of a new aircraft to be powered by Price's engine, developing the engine as the L-1000 and the aircraft as the L-133.

The proposed engine was not officially accepted, because at that time the United States government was informed of British work on jet engines. However, Price was encouraged by United States Army Air Forces (USAAF) officials at Wright Field to refine his design. His redesign incorporated two sixteen-stage axial compressors with a single stage of intercooling. The first four stages of the forward compressor remained clutched to allow them to operate at optimum speed. The turbine was reduced to four stages. The low-pressure compressor was encased in a two-part cylindrical casing with stiffening ribs, which gave it an odd appearance similar to the bottom of an egg carton. The shorter high-pressure compressor was similarly encased, but with ribs running front-to-back only. Power was taken off between the two compressor stages to power accessories, with the gearbox placed on the top of the engine outside of the compressor casings.

In June 1943 the USAAF did give Lockheed a contract for a jet-powered airplane, but it was to incorporate a British turbojet. Thereafter, Price discontinued work on his design. The sole example of his engine is displayed at Planes of Fame Air Museum, in Chino, California.

See also 
 Hans von Ohain
 Frank Whittle

References 

Year of birth missing
Year of death missing
20th-century American inventors
Jet engine pioneers